Smithfield ham is a specific form of country ham finish-cured in the town of Smithfield in Isle of Wight County in the Hampton Roads region of Virginia, U.S.

History
The first record of the commercial sale of cured "Smithfield Ham" is a receipt to Ellerston and John Perot on the Dutch Caribbean Island of St Eustatius, dating from 1779.

The Commonwealth of Virginia first regulated usage of the term "Smithfield Ham" in a 1926 Statute passed by its General Assembly stating:

The "peanut-fed" and "peanut-belt" stipulations were removed in 1966.  The present statute reads:

While it is unclear whether the green pork (the raw product of the cured ham) may come from hogs raised and slaughtered in other than Smithfield, Virginia, the statute stipulates that the six-month (minimum duration) curing clock is to begin when the green pork is "introduced to dry salt", and that through the entire duration of the process, the ham and its processing must occur within Smithfield, Virginia.  The statute also commands that any richer or more intense cure, obtained from an aging that is in excess of six months, must also be done within Smithfield, Virginia.

Gallery

See also

 List of hams
 List of dried foods
 Jinhua ham

References

Ham
Dried meat
Virginia culture
Cuisine of the Southern United States